The legislative districts of La Union are the representations of the province of La Union in the various national legislatures of the Philippines. The province is currently represented in the lower house of the Congress of the Philippines through its first and second congressional districts.

History 
La Union initially comprised a single district in 1898, when it returned four delegates to the Malolos Congress that lasted until 1899. It was later divided into two congressional districts in 1907.

From 1943 to 1945, in the disruption caused by the Second World War, two delegates represented the province in the National Assembly of the Japanese-sponsored Second Philippine Republic: one was the provincial governor (an ex officio member), while the other was elected through a provincial assembly of KALIBAPI members during the Japanese occupation of the Philippines. Upon the restoration of the Philippine Commonwealth in 1945, the province reverted to its pre-war two-district representation.

The province was represented in the Interim Batasang Pambansa as part of Region IV-A from 1978 to 1984, and returned two representatives, elected at large, to the Regular Batasang Pambansa in 1984. It regained its two congressional districts under the new Constitution which was proclaimed on February 11, 1987, and elected members to the restored House of Representatives starting that same year.

1st District 

City: San Fernando (became city 1998)
Municipalities: Bacnotan, Balaoan, Bangar, Luna, San Juan, San Gabriel (transferred from Mountain Province 1920; only allowed to elect representative starting 1935), Santol (transferred from Mountain Province 1920; only allowed to elect representative starting 1935), Sudipen (transferred from Mountain Province 1920; only allowed to elect representative starting 1935)
Population (2020):  376,529

1907–1935 
Municipalities: Bacnotan, Balaoan, Bangar, Luna, San Fernando, San Juan

2nd District 

Municipalities: Agoo, Aringay, Bauang, Caba, Naguilian, Rosario, Santo Tomas, Tubao, Bagulin (transferred from Mountain Province 1920; only allowed to elect representative starting 1935), Burgos (Disdis) (transferred from Mountain Province 1920; only allowed to elect representative starting 1935), Pugo (transferred from Mountain Province 1920; only allowed to elect representative starting 1935)
Population (2015):  445,823

1907–1935 
Municipalities: Agoo, Aringay, Bauang, Caba, Naguilian, Rosario, Santo Tomas, Tubao

At-Large (defunct)

1898–1899

1943–1944

1984–1986

See also 
 Legislative district of Mountain Province

References 

La Union
Politics of La Union